Toonerville is an unincorporated community in Bent County, Colorado, in the United States.

History
The community was named after Toonerville Folks, a comic strip.

References

Unincorporated communities in Bent County, Colorado
Unincorporated communities in Colorado